Nickelodeon Sonic (formerly Sonic-Nickelodeon) is an Indian children's pay television channel operated by Viacom18 as part of the Nickelodeon India network.

After  on the air, Sonic became the fourth most watched channel across all genres with TRP in December 2020.

History 
Viacom18 launched the channel in December 2011. When it launched, the channel mostly aired action shows like Power Rangers, Kung Fu Panda and Teenage Mutant Ninja Turtles. On 3 May 2016, the channel was rebranded with the tag line "Destination of high decibel comedy and action", and was given a new logo.

Since the rebrand, the channel has shifted its focus to comedy and started producing some original local shows.

Sonic Nickelodeon began broadcasting in Bengali, Malayalam, Marathi, and Gujarati languages from 2 December 2019.

Nickelodeon Sonic launched The Smurfs on June 13, 2022.

Programming

References

External links
 

Sonic
Nickelodeon India
Children's television channels in India
English-language television stations in India
Television stations in Mumbai
Indian animation
Television channels and stations established in 2011
2011 establishments in India
Hindi-language television channels in India
Viacom 18